"Parker's Back" is a Southern gothic short story by American author Flannery O'Connor about the efforts of a worldly tattooed Southern man to demonstrate his love for a fundamentalist Christian woman whom he courts and marries but never understands why he stays with her. After a self-indulgent, disordered, and carefree life, the story's protagonist accepts God's grace and fulfills the meaning of his given name, Obadiah, but his wife with her Old Testament beliefs rejects grace in the form of Jesus Christ tattooed on her husband's back. The work was published in 1965, in her final short story collection, Everything That Rises Must Converge. André Bleikasten, a scholar who studied Southern American writers and their works, said "'Parker's Back' belongs with O'Connor's most explicitly religious stories" as well as “one of her most enigmatic and gripping texts”.

Publication history 
"Parker's Back" first appeared in Flannery O'Connor's short story collection Everything That Rises Must Converge published in January 1965 after her death on August 3, 1964.  The author worked closely with publisher Robert Giroux to complete the collection before she perished.

The story was also published in Esquire with illustrations by Frank Bozzo in April 1965, and in O'Connor's short story collection The Complete Stories in 1971 that won the National Book Award for Fiction in 1972.

Plot summary 
"Parker’s Back" takes place some where in the rural U.S. South, contemporary with the author's lifetime, and follows the life of the protagonist, Obadiah Elihue Parker. At the beginning of the story, Parker insists on being addressed as "O. E." because his given name "stank" in his estimation. The story starts with Parker and his wife, Sarah Ruth, named for Old Testament characters, on the front porch of their house. As she snaps beans, she complains about Parker's employment by a woman, who Parker characterized as a "hefty young blonde" even though the woman was "nearly seventy years old and too dried up to have an interest in anything except getting as much work out of him as she could." Parker tries zealously to change his wife's habits, that includes disliking automobiles, "sniffing up sin", dislike for his tattoos, and fundamentalist Christian practices that contribute to her ugliness and prohibitions on tobacco and liquor. Overall, Parker internally questions why he continues to stay with an ugly wife who objects to most things he enjoys.

In disjointed digressions, the story of Parker's life prior to marriage is told.
 When Parker was fourteen, he was enthralled at the sight of a "short and sturdy" man at a fair who was covered with tattoos, the man "flexing his muscles so that the arabesque of men and beasts and flowers in his skin appeared to have a subtle motion of its own". The experience made Parker feel his existence became extraordinary and was overwhelmed by "wonder in himself" but also uneasy "as if a blind boy had been turned so gently in a different direction that he did not know his destination had been changed". He soon got his first tattoo (an eagle perched on a cannon), quit school and then trade school, and worked only to pay for more tattoos. To the tearful distress of his mother, Billy Jean, Parker got involved with "girls he liked but never liked him before", drank beer and got into fights. Billy Jean took Parker on a surprise trip to a revival but upon arrival at the church, Parker ran away at age sixteen, and enlisted in the U.S. Navy by lying about his age.  Parker was already too big for his sailor pants.

 During his naval service, Parker acquired more tattoos in ports around the world: an eagle, along with several other animals, Queen Elizabeth II and Prince Philip, and even some obscenities in places that are not visible. Parker developed an acute and raging dissatisfaction with naval service and was imprisoned for nine months and given a dishonorable discharge after he did not return to duty after a furlough ended. After release, Parker settled down in the country, bought an old truck, lived in a shack and worked odd jobs, only keeping them for as long "as it suited him".  By the time he met Sarah Ruth, he was buying apples and selling them for no profit to rural homesteaders.

 Parker met Sarah Ruth after his truck broke down. Parker's "extra sense" told him a woman was watching him. He pretended to hurt his hand while fixing his truck by yelling curses and identities. While cursing, Sarah Ruth attacked Parker with a broom, like a "giant hawk-eyed angel wielding a hoary weapon". Sarah Ruth relented when Parker said he might have broken his hand and she inspected it along with the tattoos on his hand and up his forearm.  Sarah Ruth blushed when Parker suggested she view the tattoos on the rest of his body and convinced himself that she was attracted to them like any other woman he met.

 Parker later visited Sarah Ruth, cleared a yard full of her mother's children by giving each an apple, and then shared an apple with her, which she relished. Sarah Ruth's mother took possession of the rest of Parker's bushel of apples without asking.  In spite of not intending to return, Parker was back the next day with a bushel of peaches, and then the following day with two cantaloupes. Sarah Ruth finally asked Parker for his name and in exchange for hers, he disclosed it as Obadiah, and then she pronounced "Obadiah Elihue" without any prior knowledge. Parker then tried to seduce her and suggested they lie together in the back of the truck. "Not until after we're married," she said and then pushed him out the truck on landed him on his back. They immediately got married at the Ordinary's office. Parker found marriage did not change Sarah Ruth "a jot".

The story returns to the bickering couple.

When Parker finishes contemplating his relationship with Sarah Ruth, he thinks about getting a new tattoo. The only bare area for a tattoo is on his back, because he didn’t get tattoos where he can’t see them. Now, he wants a tattoo that will both win Sarah Ruth over and stop her constant nagging. While at work, Parker rides a tractor in a field, however, he is so busy contemplating what tattoo to get that he pays no attention to where he is going and crashes into a tree his boss explicitly told him not to hit. The tractor is destroyed, resulting in a fire that destroys both machine and tree. Parker's tension comes to a head and he runs to his truck, driving the 50 miles it takes to get into the city. He runs into the tattoo salon and demands to see the book of tattoos pertaining to God, feeling that when he found the right one there would be a sign. As he flips through the book of tattoos, one particular image of Christ catches Parker's attention so much so that he turns back to it after flipping past it.

Going against the tattoo artist's suggestion for the image, Parker asks to have the tattoo of the Byzantine Christ put on his back, exactly as it is done in the book. While reluctant at first, the tattoo artist begins the procedure of putting this tattoo on Parker’s back. That night, Parker sleeps in the city's homeless shelter and returns to the tattoo shop the next morning to have the image finished. The tattoo artist mocks Parker about the possibility of being "saved", and Parker explains that he is getting the tattoo in order to make his wife back off about how he is a sinner. After the tattoo is finished, Parker originally refuses to look at it; however, the tattoo artist ultimately forces him to look at it. Parker is unhappy with the way the tattoo looks. While the artist reminds him that it was Parker's choice and that he would have recommended something different, Parker goes to a pool hall he has frequently visited in the past. After the men figure out that Parker has a new tattoo, they lift up his shirt to look at it. After seeing it, they begin to mock Parker for his "new-found faith." Parker is thrown out of the bar for starting a fight, and after laying in the dirt for some time afterward, drives home to the country.

When he arrives home, Parker knocks on the door and begs for Sarah Ruth to let him in. At first, Sarah Ruth refuses, but she opens the door after Parker refers to himself by his full given name, Obadiah Elihue. Once inside, Parker shows Sarah Ruth his tattoo, hoping for a positive reaction—that she will be glad to see that he has supposedly accepted Christ. However, Sarah Ruth flies into a fury, claiming that God doesn't "look" like anything because he has no corporeal form. She then begins screaming that Parker is committing idolatry, and that she will not tolerate that in her house. Sarah Ruth begins beating Parker's back with a broom, until he is bruised and left with welts on his back. She then proceeds to shake the broom out of the window to "get the taint of him off it". The story ends with Parker crying up against the tree in the front yard as Sarah Ruth watches dispassionately.

Symbolism

Obadiah Elihue 
Obadiah Elihue is the protagonist's Christian name, a name that "stank" to him as a boy, and is the identity he accepts at the end of the story. 
 "Obadiah" in Hebrew means "servant or slave to God". In Judaism, Obadiah is one of the Twelve Minor Prophets in the final section of Nevi'im, the second main division of the Tanakh. In Christianity, the Book of Obadiah is classified as a minor prophet of the Old Testament, and in first Book of Kings chapter 18, he acts as a protector of prophets.  As O. E., Parker's generosity for providing homesteaders fruit at no cost is a small step towards the likeness of the prophet, who generously expended all of his wealth feeding poor prophets.
 Elihue is the father of Elkanah, the father of the Old Testament character Samuel.
 Biblically, both Obadiah and Elihue share the quality of "commonness", and the untattooed boy O. E. is characterized in "Parker's Back" "as ordinary as a loaf of bread".

The Byzantine Christ tattoo and the Parkers' pecan tree 
The Byzantine Christ tattoo Parker has on his back is that of a Christ Pantocrator. The Pantocrator is a glorified icon among the Eastern Catholic and Orthodox Churches.  For the protagonist, the image has "eyes to be obeyed", representing his commitment to fulfill the meaning of his given name as a "servant or slave of God". As elaborated by Bleikasten: "[The eyes] betoken the final dis-owning, the final ex-propriation of his body, the ultimate dispossession of his self through absolute surrender to [God's] Law. ...Obadiah Elihu Parker is ready, at long last, to become one of God's prophets and martyrs."  Since Parker's wife rejects images of Jesus as idolatry and regards Jesus as only a spirit and not the Savior of mankind, Parker suffers from the rejection of his gift to her and rejection of his new identity. Parker with the battered image of Christ on his back, suffers by his pecan tree as Jesus suffered, as the tree is a representation of the cross upon which Jesus was crucified.

References 

Short stories by Flannery O'Connor
1964 short stories
Third-person narrative fiction
Tattooing and religion